The 2016–17 Elitserien was the tenth season of the present highest Swedish men's bandy top division, Elitserien. The regular season began on 21 October 2016, and the final was played at Tele2 Arena in Stockholm on 25 March 2017. Edsbyns IF won the Swedish national championship title by defeating Bollnäs GIF, 3–1, in the final game, thereby securing Edsbyn's tenth championship title, making the club alone the third most successful Swedish bandy club so far.

Teams

Teams 1–10 from the regular 2015–16 Elitserien league were automatically qualified for this season's play in the top-tier divisionen. All four teams from the 2015/2016 season which played the qualification games (IK Sirius, Gripen Trollhättan BK, Kalix BF and TB Västerås) managed to stay in the Elitserien.  

* – indoor arena

Results

League table

Knock-out stage
The quarter finals and the semi finals are played in best of five games, interchangeably on home ice and away ice, while the final is one game played in Stockholm, the Swedish capital.

Quarter-finals

Villa Lidköping BK – IFK Vänersborg

Bollnäs GIF – Hammarby IF

Edsbyns IF – Broberg/Söderhamn Bandy

Sandvikens AIK – Västerås SK

Semi-finals

Villa Lidköping BK – Bollnäs GIF

Edsbyns IF – Sandvikens AIK

Final

Season statistics

Top scorers

References

Elitserien (bandy) seasons
Bandy
Bandy
Elitserien
Elitserien